Ron Lugbill is a former American slalom canoeist who competed from the mid-1970s to the early 1980s.

He won a gold medal in the C-1 team event at the 1981 ICF Canoe Slalom World Championships in Bala, Wales, UK.

Ron is the older brother of one of the sport's all-time greats Jon Lugbill.

References
Overview of athlete's results at canoeslalom.net 

American male canoeists
Living people
Year of birth missing (living people)
Medalists at the ICF Canoe Slalom World Championships